A2C may refer to:

Jingmen A2C Ultra Seaplane
Abbreviation for Airman Second Class, a rank in the United States Air Force
Advantage Actor Critic, a reinforcement learning algorithm